2nd II None is the self-titled debut album from Compton hip hop duo 2nd II None. The album was released on October 8, 1991 under Profile Records and was entirely produced by DJ Quik.

Track listing 
All tracks produced by DJ Quik

Personnel
HI-C: Additional Vocals on "Comin' Like This" and "Niggaz Trippin'"
DJ Quik: Keyboards
Robert Bacon: Guitars and Bass

Production
Arranged by DJ Quik
Produced by DJ Quik and 2nd II None
Recorded by Sean Freehill and DJ Quik
Mixed by DJ Quik at Skip Saylor Studios (Los Angeles)
Mastered by Howie Weinberg at Masterdisk
All songs published by Protoons, Inc./Greedy Greg Music, except "What Goes Up" (which contains a portion of "Spinning Wheel" as written by David Clayton Thomas).  "What Goes Up" published by Protoons, Inc./Greedy Greg Music/EMI Blackwood Music Inc. and Bay Music Ltd.

Charts

Weekly charts

Year-end charts

References

2nd II None albums
Albums produced by DJ Quik
Profile Records albums
1991 debut albums